The speaker of the Riksdag is assisted by three deputy speakers who are also elected by a vote in the chamber.

Traditionally, the second, third and fourth largest parties gets to name of one of their members for these offices. There is some disagreement whether the largest party or the leader of the largest party bloc should hold the Speakership. Unlike the Speaker (and cabinet ministers), the deputy speakers are not replaced by an alternate and remain members of the Riksdag with voting rights.

List of deputy speakers 
This is a list of deputy speakers of the Riksdag, since it became a unicameral body 1971.

First deputy speaker

Second deputy speaker

Third deputy speaker

References
 The Instrument of Government, in English (as of 2012) (PDF), The Riksdag (2012). Retrieved on 2012-11-13.

Deputy Speakers of the Parliament of Sweden
Riksdag
Deputy speakers of the Riksdag